Luzuko S'phelo Nteleko (16 February 1984 – 21 June 2021) was a South African actor and entrepreneur. He is best known for the roles in the television serials Mfolozi Street, Zone 14, Streets of Mangaung, Gauteng Maboneng and Muvhango.

Personal life
Luzuko Nteleko was born on 16 February 1984 in Sebokeng, Gauteng, South Africa. He left home at the age of 19 and moved to Johannesburg to pursue a career. He enrolled at Technikon Witwatersrand to study tourism management, but dropped out in 2002. He had five sisters and two brothers including, Nomsa Nteleko.

In 2019, Nteleko was diagnosed with Stage 4 brain cancer. In 2021, he spent seven weeks in ICU in a coma. He died on 21 June 2021, at the age of 37. A memorial service was held on 26 July 2021 at 1pm at Sebokeng, Zone 14 Sports Centre. Public participation was restricted due to COVID-19 pandemic, but the service was streamed live on YouTube and broadcast on channel 504 on Mpumalanga Broadcasting Television at 6pm. His remains were laid to rest at his family home in the Eastern Cape on 2 July 2021.

Career
In early 2000s, he made popular appearances in advertisements, particularly remembered for Absa's banking App TV commercial. In 2004, he got the opportunity to join with a British production house and played the lead role of a DStv's Discovery Channel docu-drama.

In 2005, he joined the third season of the SABC1 drama serial Zone 14 with the role of "Loyiso". The role became very popular, where he continued to play the role in fourth season as well. In 2012, he appeared as "Student Constable Lebogang Chuene" on season one of SABC2 Police Procedural serial Streets of Mangaung. In 2014, he played the role of "Jacob Boy" in the Mzansi Magic miniseries 4 Hours. Later in the same year, he appeared in the SABC1 sitcom Single Galz with a guest role of "Bobby".

Then in 2015, he acted in the SABC2 soap opera Muvhango, by playing the role of "Lwazi". In the same year, he had the recurring role of "Lwazi" on the SABC1 drama serial Mfolozi Street. He continued to play the role until 2016. In 2016, he joined the third season of SABC1 fashion drama serial Tempy Pushas, where he played the role of "X". In 2018, he acted in the LGBTQ US drama series About Him and played the role of "Zumbi". His final television appearance came through the Mzansi political serial Ambitions with the role of "Wandile Cibane".

He was also a businessman, who owned an educational & industrial theatre and promotions company. He was also a soccer player.

Filmography

References

1984 births
2021 deaths
South African male film actors
People from Gauteng
South African male television actors
Deaths from brain cancer in South Africa